Sarab (also Romanized as Sarāb) is a city in the Central District of Sarab County, East Azerbaijan province, Iran, and serves as capital of the county. At the 2006 census, its population was 42,057 in 11,045 households. The following census in 2011 counted 44,846 people in 13,353 households. The latest census in 2016 showed a population of 45,031 people in 13,953 households.

Sarab  is famous for its rugs.

Rugs
The rugs of Sarab, which are also classified among those known as Heriz, have light, rather bright colour schemes. The usual adjective for "of Sarab" would be "Sarab-i", this changed to "Serapi". In 1876, about the time that Sarabi rugs were coming on the market in England, the Prince of Wales made a trip to India on H.M.S. Serapis.  The similarity of the names led to the form "Serapi" for the rugs.

Climate
Sarab has a cold semi-arid climate (Köppen BSk). Winters are cold and snowy, while summers are warm to hot with little precipitation. Most of the annual precipitation falls between the months of November and May.

Higher education 
 Islamic Azad University, Sarab Branch
 Sama Technical College of Sarab
 Payame noor University of Sarab
 Allameh Amini Technical College of Sarab

See also 

 Sarab Khanate

External links 
 Information Site of Sarab City

References 

Sarab County

Cities in East Azerbaijan Province

Populated places in East Azerbaijan Province

Populated places in Sarab County